The Adams-Leslie House is a historic house located in rural Bradley County, Arkansas, near Warren.

Description and history 
The two-story, timber-framed house was built in 1903 by William James Leslie and his father-in-law, Julius Henry Adams, and is the only historic house remaining in the Sand Tuck-Hickory Springs part of the county. It was designed by Thomas L. Brown in a vernacular late Victorian style, with pilastered corner boards and gable ends decorated with vergeboard and alternating fish-scale and diamond shingles.

The house was listed on the National Register of Historic Places on August 9, 1979.

See also
National Register of Historic Places listings in Bradley County, Arkansas

References

Houses on the National Register of Historic Places in Arkansas
Houses in Bradley County, Arkansas
National Register of Historic Places in Bradley County, Arkansas
Houses completed in 1903
Victorian architecture in Arkansas
1903 establishments in Arkansas